Paul-Andre Touzin (born May 19, 1954) is a Canadian former ice hockey goaltender. He was selected by the St. Louis Blues in the 9th round (149th overall) of the 1974 NHL amateur draft, and was also drafted by the Michigan Stags in the 8th round (108th overall) of the 1974 WHA Amateur Draft.

Awards and honours

References

External links

1954 births
Living people
Canadian ice hockey goaltenders
Ice hockey people from Quebec
Michigan Stags draft picks
Shawinigan Bruins players
St. Louis Blues draft picks